Sampat Tukaram Ramteke (Aug 1949 - Nov 2017) was an engineer and social activist from Nagpur, Maharashtra, India. In 2018, he was conferred the Padma Shri civilian honour posthumously, for his contribution in raising awareness about the sickle cell disease.

Career 
He worked at Western Coalfields Limited (WCL) and retired as a superintending engineer in 2010.

Social activism 
Ramteke is considered as the torchbearer of the movement for raising awareness about sickle cell disease. It started when his son was diagnosed with the disease. In 1991, he founded the Sickle Cell Society of India (SCSI) and worked towards raising awareness about sickle cell disease for over three decades. Due to his efforts, patients with the disease came to be included in the Rights of Persons with Disabilities Act (2016).

Personal life 
He and his wife had a son and daughter. He died in November 2017 due to cardiac arrest.

References 

1950 births
Date of birth missing
2017 deaths
Place of death missing
People from Nagpur
Recipients of the Padma Shri in social work
Engineers from Maharashtra
Activists from Maharashtra